Shinobu is an American indie rock band formed in 2002 in San Jose, California. The group consists of Mike Huguenor (vocals, guitar), Matt Keegan (trombone, guitar, vocals, keyboards), Bob Vielma (bass, vocals), Jon Fu (drums), John DeDomenici (bass, drums), Jeff Rosenstock (guitar, vocals), Vince Tran (guitar), and Doug Bellucci (drums).

They released their debut EP Exhaustion Exhaustion in 2003, their debut album Herostratus vs. Time was released in October 2004, and in 2006 they released Worstward Ho!, their sophomore album through Asian Man Records; their first release with distribution, their latest release 10 Thermidor was released through Quote Unquote Records digitally for free and physically on Lauren Records and Really Records.

They're currently signed to Quote Unquote Records, Asian Man Records, and Phat 'N' Phunky. 

They have played with acts such as Xiu Xiu, The Exquisites, Bomb the Music Industry!, Ted Leo and the Pharmacists, Emperor X and AJJ. 

Heavily influenced by bands like Death Cab for Cutie, the Weakerthans, Pixies, Neutral Milk Hotel, and Pavement, they are well known for their thoughtful, clever, existentialist, usually self-deprecating lyrics, their off kilter drumming and sharp angular fractured noisy guitar riffs and their odd use of lo-fi production techniques.

According to Vice, they are arguably one of the most subtly influential bands on the current DIY indie punk scene.

Joyce Manor, PUP, and Touché Amoré are among the numerous bands that credit Shinobu as one of their biggest influences.

The term "Shinobu" means "recall" in Japanese and is mostly likely a reference to the anime and manga series Urusei Yatsura.

Discography

References 

American punk rock groups